The Míting Internacional d'Atletisme Ciutat de Barcelona (also known as the Reunión Internacional Ciudad de Barcelona) is an annual athletics meeting held at the Estadi Olímpic Lluís Companys in Barcelona, Catalonia, Spain. The Meeting was held annually from 1982 to 1990, in 1993 and annually from 1998 to 2000. Before 1990 it was held at Estadio Municipal Joan Serrahima. Re-established in 2008, it is usually held in mid-July. In 2011 it was a European Athletics premium meeting. The 2017 and 2018 editions returned to Estadio Municipal Joan Serrahima.

Meeting records

Men

Women

References

External links
Official website (old)

Recurring sporting events established in 1982
Athletics in Barcelona
European Athletic Association meetings
Athletics competitions in Catalonia